Carlos "Kukín" Flores Murillo (August 4, 1974 – February 17, 2019) was a Peruvian Footballer who played for several Clubs.

Early Childhood
Carlos Flores was born in ‘Los Barracones’ in Callao, Peru and during his childhood he lived in Chucuito, Castilla, La Perla, Ciudad del Pescador, Atahualpa and the human settlement Canada. He was the youngest of 11 brothers and since he was five years old he had the need to clean cars to be able to watch for himself. About this, Flores commented that he is proud about the work he did with cars as a kid. He thought about it as an honorable job. He even told a story about how he looked after Julio Cesar Uribe’s car some time before Spain’s World Cup in 1982. He also said that he got a tip (he did not remember how much), but said that the best tip he got was the fact that Julio Cesar Uribe was crucial in Peru’s qualification for the world cup.

On a Peruvian TV show called ‘El Valor de la Verdad’ (The Value of Truth in English), Flores told Beto Ortiz, the host of the show, that him and his ten brothers were abandoned by their parents when he was very young. It was his oldest sister, Rosario, who took care of the family. According to ‘Kukin’, she played the part of both a father and a mother for him and the rest of his brothers. He also mentioned that she was living in Chile at the time the show was broadcast (2004).

Furthermore, he said that one day police officers arrived at the house where he used to live with his brothers to inform them that their parents had sold the house and that they had twenty-four hours to evacuate the place. It was true, they had documents signed by both his parents that proved it. When asked if he knows why his parents did the things they did, he replied no. His father died in the early 1990s. About his mother, he said she was still alive during the time of this interview and that he loved her very much. “I don’t want to judge her”, he said.

Youth Soccer
Despite not having a long Youth Soccer career, given that he made his professional soccer debut with Sport Boys Association aged 16, it was transcendental for his development as both a person and soccer player. According to a chronicle written by María del Carmen Irigoyen and published by El Comercio, one of Peru's most important newspapers, Academia Deportiva Cantolao was kind of a second family for Flores.

Cesar Gonzales, who trained Flores both in Academia Deportiva Cantolao and Sport Boys Association, told the author that the other kid's parents used to take care of him, for example, giving him money for him to be able to fly for the team's international tours. Academia Deportiva Cantolao also matriculated Flores to the Liceo Naval Almirante Guise, a School located in the San Borja district in Lima. However, as Gonzales explained he didn't last long, Flores didn't like rules nor systems.  The same thing happened with soccer and tactics. “You just gave him a jersey and he would do whatever he wanted. [...]. It was all his ideas, his magic”, Gonzales said.

Club career
Flores has played for a number of clubs in Peru, including Alianza Lima, Universitario de Deportes and Sport Boys. He had also had a spell with Aris in the Greek Super League during the 1998-99 season. However, the club where he spent the most time was Sport boys.

International career
Flores appeared twice for the senior Peru national football team, making his debut in a friendly against the Netherlands on 10 October 1998. His last match was a qualifier for the 2002 FIFA World Cup. This game was Against the Colombia National Football Team in the year 2000. Peru's National Football Team lost the game 1-0 (goalscorer: Juan Pablo Angel), and Flores played the last thirty minutes of the game. According to El Comercio, Flores' performance was good enough for Francisco Maturana, who was Peru's trainer at the time, to put his as a starter in the next game against Uruguay. However, the next training session Flores claimed he injured himself during an exercise. After the team's doctor made some tests, it was clear that Flores's injury was not a soccer injury. It is reported by El Comercio that after investigating the incident it was discovered that Flores had been involved in a street fight and was never summoned for Peru's National Team again.

Scandals
Flores’ career was marked by a high number of scandals off the pitch. Besides the one previously mentioned, where he got injured during a street fight after the 2002 World Cup Qualifiers match against Colombia, there are some incidents that Peruvians may remember. During 2004 he was found lying on the street half-naked. A video went viral where a woman could be seen trying to help him. During this scandal Flores was smiling and not responsive. He then said that while he was home he saw a woman's ghost and run to the streets to ask for help. Another scandal Kukin starred was when he felt down 4 stories from his apartment window. According to witnesses, he tried to enter through the window after he forgot his keys.

Flores was also known for the use of recreational drugs, more precisely cocaine. During the previously mentioned interview in Beto Ortiz's TV show ‘El Valor de la Verdad’, he revealed that he used cocaine while being a soccer player. When asked about how he hid his drug using (professional soccer players are randomly tested for drug use after games), he said that he had a way to beat the test. However, he said he was not going to reveal his trick in order not to foment the use of drugs in kids and athletes.

Trivia
On 8 January 2009 it was reported that Flores claimed he was being chased by ghosts. He eventually admitted that he had been "engaging with dirty ladies" and that he manufactured the ghost story to try to hide the truth from his wife.

Death
On February 17, 2019, Flores died from a heart attack and his body was found on his apartment at San Miguel, a district in Lima. He was 44. Hours after his death, a photo went viral that showed Flores lying on the floor dead, with a mysterious package, which was thought to be cocaine by his side. Police reports after the incident showed that Flores was in a paranoia attack and wanted to commit suicide, because he thought he was being followed and that somebody wanted him dead. This report was signed by Liz Contreras, who was the soccer player's girlfriend at the time of his death and the only witness. After a couple of days, Contreras was interviewed by Reporte Semanal, a TV show from Latina Televisión, explaining that she signed the police report because she was on a state of shock after his boyfriend's death and giving her side of the story. During the interview, she said that Flores first suffered a seizure and woke up moments later, not being able to remember details like her name. It is important to mention that they had already been dating for more than three years. More importantly, she said that what was thought to be cocaine was in fact a blister of pills she was taking for some reason she did not mention. As the cause of Flores's death is still not clear, prosecutor Claudia Gutiérrez Aragón started an investigation.

References

External links

Peru 21: Murió Kukin Flores
El Comercio - Cronica: Kukin y la batalla contra sus demonios
Peru 21: La Vida Exagerada de Kukin Flores
Peru 21: Muerte de ex futbolista Kukin Flores habría sido por ingesta de sustancias tóxicas
El Comercio: Carlos Kukin Flores falleció a los 44 años en vivienda de San Miguel
Kukín Flores se llevó 25 mil soles en El Valor De La Verdad
El Comercio - Kukin Flores: argucia le costo continuidad selección peruana
RPP: Kukin Flores aparece en video semidesnudo y en estado lamentable
Depor: cinco grandes escándalos de jugadores peruanos
DSN: Kukin Flores, el niño abandonado que fue comparado con Pele
Reporte Semanal: habla la única testigo de la muerte de Kukín Flores

1974 births
2019 deaths
Sportspeople from Callao
Association football midfielders
Peruvian footballers
Peru international footballers
Peruvian Primera División players
Argentine Primera División players
Place of death missing
Super League Greece players
Categoría Primera A players
Saudi Professional League players
Aris Thessaloniki F.C. players
Al Hilal SFC players
Club Athletico Paranaense players
Sport Boys footballers
Club Atlético Belgrano footballers
Unión Huaral footballers
Club Deportivo Wanka footballers
Club Universitario de Deportes footballers
Sport Áncash footballers
Deportivo Pereira footballers
Ayacucho FC footballers
Expatriate footballers in Argentina
Expatriate footballers in Brazil
Expatriate footballers in Colombia
Expatriate footballers in Greece
Expatriate footballers in Saudi Arabia